The 1933 Cork Senior Hurling Championship was the 45th staging of the Cork Senior Hurling Championship since its establishment by the Cork County Board in 1887. The draw for the opening round fixtures took place at the Cork Convention on 30 January 1933. The championship began on 2 April 1933 and ended on 22 October 1933.

St. Finbarr's were the defending champions. Divisional sides Avondhu, Carbery and Muskerry fielded teams in the championship for the first time.

On 22 October 1933, St. Finbarr's won the championship following a 6–6 to 5–0 defeat of Carrigtwohill in a replay of the final. This was their 10th championship title overall and their second title in succession.

Results

First round

Second round

Semi-finals

Finals

References

Cork Senior Hurling Championship
Cork Senior Hurling Championship